Taliparamba West is a group of suburbs and villages on the north and west of Taliparamba town.  The locality is divided into two parts, south and north; South Kuppam is a part of Taliparamba municipality while North Kuppam, near Mukkunnu, is a part of Pariyaram village Panchayath.

During the 1960s and 1970s this village was a commercial center of spices. The National Highway-17 passes through Kuppam.

Suburbs and villages
 Narikode, Muthukuda and Ezhome
 Pattuvam, Cherukunnu and Pazhayangadi
 Kadannappally, Kuttiyeri, Pariyaram and Pilathara

Kuppam River
Kuppam got its name from the Kuppam River, one of the 44 Rivers of Kerala, which originates from the hilly area of western Karnataka and flows into the Arabian Sea.

Once, waterways in the Kuppam River were the only mode of travel into the hilly areas of Kannur district. But since the construction of Kuppam Bridge, passenger boats have almost disappeared. The Kuppam Bridge was built in 1958 with British construction methods, which consists of five huge arches each side. The bridge is attractive for its construction style. A new bridge at Kuttiyeri Kadavu, connecting Kuttiyeri and Pariyaram opened in 2015.

See also
 Kuppam River
 Taliparamba
 Narikode
 Iringal
 Vellavu
 Vayad
 Thiruvettoor
 Chapparapadavu

Image gallery

Location

See also
 Taliparamba
 Pattuvam
 Ezhom
 Pariyaram
 Pilathara
 Pazhayangadi

Taliparamba